Mary McConneloug (born June 24, 1971 in San Francisco, California) is a racing cyclist from the United States, specializing in competitive mountain biking. She is a four time USA Cross Country Mountain Bike National Champion having captured the title in 2003, 2005, 2007, 2008.

McConneloug graduated from Santa Clara University in 1993 with a Bachelor of Music degree in Vocal Performance.

McConneloug twice represented her native country at the Summer Olympics (2004 and 2008), where she finished in 9th and 7th place respectively in the final rankings of the women's cross-country race. In 2003, she claimed the silver medal at the Pan American Games in Santo Domingo, Dominican Republic, behind Argentina's Jimena Florit.

After nearly 15 years of international competition in cross country racing, and representing USA Cycling National Team for 13 years, Mary and her long-time teammate and husband Mike Briderick turned their focus to Enduro MTB racing, following the Enduro World Series as Master's (40+) athletes.

References

sports-reference

1971 births
Living people
American female cyclists
Cross-country mountain bikers
Cyclists at the 2004 Summer Olympics
Cyclists at the 2008 Summer Olympics
Cyclists at the 2003 Pan American Games
Cyclists at the 2007 Pan American Games
Olympic cyclists of the United States
Sportspeople from San Francisco
Pan American Games silver medalists for the United States
Pan American Games medalists in cycling
American mountain bikers
Medalists at the 2003 Pan American Games
Medalists at the 2007 Pan American Games